is a train station in Sakyō-ku, Kyoto, Japan.

Lines
Eizan Electric Railway (Eiden)
Eizan Main Line

Adjacent stations

Railway stations in Kyoto Prefecture
Railway stations in Japan opened in 1925